Bill Hudson may refer to:

Bill Hudson (Alaska politician) (born 1932), American politician
Bill Hudson (alpine skier) (born 1966), American alpine skier
Bill Hudson (American football) (1935–2017), American football defensive tackle
Bill Hudson (British Army officer) (1910–1995), British Special Operations Executive officer 
Bill Hudson (footballer) (1920–1945), Australian rules footballer
Bill Hudson (guitarist) (born 1988), heavy metal guitarist
Bill Hudson (ice hockey) (1910–1988), ice hockey player
Bill Hudson (photographer) (1932–2010), American photojournalist
Bill Hudson (rugby league), English rugby league footballer
Bill Hudson (singer) (born 1949), musician in Hudson Brothers
Billy Hudson (1938-2022), American politician

See also
William Hudson (disambiguation)